WDMG (860 AM) is a radio station broadcasting a Mexican music format. Licensed to Douglas, Georgia, United States.  The station is currently owned by Broadcast South, LLC.

References

External links
La Que Buena 860 Facebook

DMG